Ian Edward Happ (born August 12, 1994) is an American professional baseball outfielder for the Chicago Cubs of Major League Baseball (MLB). He played college baseball at the University of Cincinnati for the Cincinnati Bearcats baseball team. The Cubs selected Happ in the first round of the 2015 MLB draft, and he made his MLB debut in 2017.

Amateur career
Happ attended Mt. Lebanon High School in Mt. Lebanon, Pennsylvania. In four seasons, he hit .449 with 12 home runs and 65 runs batted in (RBI).

He committed to the University of Cincinnati to play college baseball for the Bearcats. As a freshman, Happ started in all 56 games and had a team high .322 batting average, .483 slugging percentage, .451 on-base percentage, six home runs, 41 runs scored, 13 doubles, and 47 walks. As a sophomore in 2014, he started 50 of 51 games. He hit .322/.443/.497 with five home runs and 19 stolen bases. After Happ's freshman and sophomore seasons in 2013 and 2014, he played collegiate summer baseball for the Harwich Mariners of the Cape Cod Baseball League (CCBL), was named a league all-star both seasons, and is a member of the CCBL Hall of Fame class of 2022. As a junior, he played in 56 games for Cincinnati, hitting .369/.492/.672 with 14 home runs and 44 RBIs.

Professional career

Minor leagues
Happ was considered one of the top prospects for the 2015 Major League Baseball draft. The Chicago Cubs selected him in the first round, with the ninth overall selection. Happ became the 50th player drafted from the Cincinnati Bearcats; 2008 picks Josh Harrison (6th round) and Tony Campana (13th round) also both played for Cincinnati and were drafted by the Cubs, and former Bearcat and MLB 3-time All Star Kevin Youkilis is the Cubs Scouting and Player Development consultant.

After he signed with the Cubs, Happ made his professional debut with the Eugene Emeralds of the Class A-Short Season Northwest League. In July, he was promoted to the South Bend Cubs of the Class A Midwest League. In 67 games between both clubs, he batted .259 with nine home runs and 33 RBIs. After playing the outfield positions during his first year of professional baseball, Happ was sent to the Myrtle Beach Pelicans of the Class A-Advanced Carolina League to start the 2016 season and began playing second base regularly. MLB.com ranked him the third best prospect in Chicago's farm system to start the year. Happ was promoted to the Tennessee Smokies of the Class AA Southern League in June. In 134 total games, he batted .279/.365/.445 with 15 home runs, 73 RBIs, and 16 stolen bases. After the season, the Cubs assigned Happ to the Mesa Solar Sox of the Arizona Fall League.

2017 season
Happ began the 2017 season with the Iowa Cubs of the Class AAA Pacific Coast League. The Cubs promoted Happ to the major leagues on May 13.  In 26 games for Iowa prior his promotion, he was batting .298 with nine home runs and 25 RBIs. He made his debut the same day he was called up, and hit a 413-foot home run off of Carlos Martínez of the St. Louis Cardinals for his first career MLB hit. In a June 13 game at Citi Field against the New York Mets, Happ became the fifth player in MLB history to hit a grand slam and strike out four times in the same game. After Happ's 10th home run of the season, Cubs manager Joe Maddon said, "When he hits it, it goes quickly." Happ hit his 20th home run on August 30 against Pittsburgh Pirates starter Iván Nova. He hit his 23rd on September 28 and his 24th the following day which was the second-most for a rookie switch-hitter in National League history. He was third among NL rookies with 67 RBIs. Happ spent the remainder of the 2017 season with the Cubs after his June 13 promotion, and in 115 games, he slashed .253/.328/.514 with 24 home runs and 68 RBIs.

2018 season
On the March 29 opening day game against the Miami Marlins, Happ hit a home run off of Jose Urena on the first pitch, becoming the second player in MLB history to hit a home run off the first pitch of an MLB season. He finished the season slashing .233/.353/.408 with 15 home runs and 44 RBIs in 142 games, striking out 167 times.

2019 season
Happ was optioned to the Iowa Cubs to begin the 2019 Season, after slashing .135/.196/.192 during 17 spring training games, to work on cutting down his strikeout rate. Happ was recalled to the majors on July 25, 2019. Happ finished the season with 11 home runs and 30 RBIs. He slashed .297/.409/.622 in 58 games, striking out 39 times. He was named National League Player of the Week on September 30, 2019.

2020 season
Happ started the COVID-19-shortened 2020 season in center field for the Cubs. He hit .258/.361/.505 with 12 home runs and 28 RBIs in 57 games.

2021 season
In 2021, Happ hit .226/.323/.434 in 148 games for the Cubs. He led the team with 66 RBIs and set career highs with 105 hits, 25 home runs, 63 runs scored and 9 stolen bases.

2022 season
In 2022, Happ finished the season with a career-high 158 games played, hitting .271/.342/.440  with 17 home runs, 72 RBIs, 72 runs, and 42 doubles. He made his first All-Star game and on defense won a Gold Glove Award in left field.

Personal life
Happ chose "Happer" as his nickname for the Players Weekend during the 2017 season. In 2021, Happ invested in Jomboy Media, a digital media company that produces content focused on sports and pop culture. As part of the investment, Happ agreed to host his podcast, The Compound, on the Jomboy Media network.

Happ and girlfriend Julie Mazur got engaged in May 2022.

References

External links

Cincinnati Bearcats bio

1994 births
Living people
Baseball players from Pittsburgh
Baseball second basemen
Major League Baseball outfielders
Chicago Cubs players
National League All-Stars
Gold Glove Award winners
Cincinnati Bearcats baseball players
Eugene Emeralds players
South Bend Cubs players
Myrtle Beach Pelicans players
Tennessee Smokies players
Mesa Solar Sox players
Iowa Cubs players
Harwich Mariners players